Scammonden Reservoir is a water reservoir in West Yorkshire, England. The reservoir holds .

History 
Scammonden Dam is part of the M62 motorway between junctions 22 and 23, the only such structure in Britain. Its construction by the Ministry of Transport and Huddersfield Corporation Waterworks required the passing of the Huddersfield Corporation Act 1965. The motorway dam spans the Deanhead Valley in the Pennines between Huddersfield and Rochdale and the main contractor for the project was  Sir Alfred McAlpine & Sons. Deanhead village was submerged and many buildings demolished to make way for the reservoir but the church remains and its vicarage is used by the sailing club. Both the church and adjacent school were at risk of slipping down the hillside into the dam and were not used after 1971 when the motorway opened. The church was renovated in 2002 and the old schoolhouse has been converted into a private dwelling.

Surveying began in November 1961 and the route of the carriageway was determined in mid 1963. Excavation in the Deanhead Valley commenced the following year and for the dam in 1966.

The overflow bellmouth, next to the valve shaft superstructure, discharges water to the valley below via a tunnel in the valley on the reservoir's eastern side. The reservoir started to fill in July 1969 and the area was landscaped and parking and other facilities were provided.

The motorway, which was dependent on the completion of the dam, was opened to traffic on 20 December 1970 and officially opened by Queen Elizabeth II who unveiled a plaque near the valve tower of Scammonden Water on 14 October 1971.

Leisure activities 
The reservoir is home to Scammonden Water Sailing Club or SWSC. The sailing club has the exclusive rights to the water, which means that the activities on the water are either dingy cruising or racing. Other activities occasionally take place usually under the auspices of the scouts.

Huddersfield Scout Sailing is a Royal Yachting Association Training Centre run by volunteers for scouts and guides.
There is also a scouting activity centre located at the water's edge which also holds the boat workshop for scout sailing.

Scammonden Steps
Close to the reservoir, at the other side of the motorway and dam wall, Scammonden steps comprises five flights of steps up the hillside from the valley below. Totaling 458 steps, the cumulative step count when ascending each of the five flights is 95, 200, 287, 363 then 458.

References

Sources

External links 

 M62. Boundary to Pole Moor (J22 to West of J23)
 West Yorkshire in 360°! Scammonden reservoir
 Yorkshire Water – Scammonden Reservoir

Reservoirs in West Yorkshire
Geography of Kirklees